Heiås is a village in the municipality of Trøgstad, Norway. Its population (SSB 2005) is 654.

Villages in Østfold